South Africa competed at the 2015 World Aquatics Championships in Kazan, Russia from 24 July to 9 August 2015.

Medalists

Diving

South African divers qualified for the individual spots and the synchronized teams at the World Championships.

Women

Open water swimming

South Africa has fielded a team of six swimmers to compete in the open water marathon.

Men

Women

Mixed

Swimming

South African swimmers have achieved qualifying standards in the following events (up to a maximum of 2 swimmers in each event at the A-standard entry time, and 1 at the B-standard):

Men

Synchronized swimming

South Africa has qualified three synchronized swimmers in the following events.

Water polo

Men's tournament

Team roster

Dwayne Flatscher
Etienne Le Roux
Devon Card
Ignardus Badenhorst
Nicholas Hock
Joao Marco de Carvalho
Dayne Jagga
Jared Wingate-Pearse
Dean Whyte
Pierre Le Roux
Nicholas Molyneux
Wesley Bohata
Julian Lewis

Group play

Playoffs

9th–12th place semifinals

Eleventh place game

Women's tournament

Team roster

Rebecca Thomas
Megan Parkes
Kieren Paley
Ruby Versfeld
Megan Schooling
Amica Hallendorff
Kimberly Kay
Delaine Christien
Lindsay Killeen
Deborah O'Hanlon
Kelsey White
Alexandre Gaiscoigne

Group play

13th–16th place semifinals

15th place game

References

External links
Swimming South Africa

Nations at the 2015 World Aquatics Championships
2015
World Aquatics Championships